Aguilar, or in full Aguilar de la Frontera, is a municipality and town in the province of Córdoba, Andalusia, southern Spain,  near the small river Cabra,  from the provincial capital, Córdoba, on the Córdoba-Málaga railway. As Ancient Ipagro, it also was an Ancient/medieval bishopric and remains a Latin Catholic titular see.

The population has remained stable during the past hundred years, numbering 13,653 in 2007.

History 
First traces of human presence in the area date to the middle Palaeolithic Age. The Romans captured it from the Iberians during the time of the Roman Republic and named it Ipagro, which took part in the civil war between Julius Caesar and Pompey, and flourished in the early Imperial Age. After the fall of the Western Roman Empire, it was ruled by the Visigoths and, from the 8th century, by the Muslim emirate of Córdoba, with the name of Bulay (also Pulay).

In the 9th century  it became the headquarters of the rebel Umar ibn Hafsun, who built extensive fortifications and reinforced the castle.   However, in 891, Umar ibn Hafsun lost the town to emir Abdallah ibn Muhammad of Córdoba.  Due to its strategic position, it was contested and, after the dissolution of the caliphate of Córdoba, it became part of the cora of Cabra. In 1240 it was conquered by the Christians, although numerous Muslims were allowed to remain. King Peter I of Castile assigned its seigniory to Alfonso Fernandez Coronel, but later reannexed it to the crown. The town was renamed Aguilar of the Frontier due to its position on the border with the Moorish Kingdom of Granada.

In 1370, due to the loyalty shown in the civil war, King Henry II of Castile gave Aguilar to Gonzalo Fernandez de Cordoba, first of a dynasty who held the town until the abolition of feudalism in the 19th century. The town grew until the 1570s-1580s, after which it decayed, also due to several plague outbreaks which decimated the population, and to the shrinking level of the agriculture.

During the Spanish Civil War Aguilar sided with the Nationalist faction. Many of its citizens fell fighting for the nationalist cause. A cross erected in their honour was demolished in 2021 by the town hall, causing international outrage.

Ecclesiastical history 
Ipagro once was a suffragan bishopric of the Metropolitan Archdiocese of Sevilla, survived the 8th century of advent of Islam but was suppressed.
 
Only two bishops are historically documented :
 Simagine, mentioned at the council of Elvira
 Recafredo, mentioned in 839.

Titular see 
The diocese was nominally restored in 1969 as Latin Titular bishopric of Ipagro (Latin = Curiate Italian) / Epagren(sis) (Latin adjective).

It has had the following incumbents, so far of the fitting Episcopal (lowest) rank:
 Malcolm A. MacEachern (1970.02.24 – 1970.11.23) on emeritate as former Bishop of Charlottetown (Canada) (1954.11.27 – 1970.02.24); died 1982 
 James Patrick Mahoney (1972.07.25 – death 2002.06.01) as Auxiliary Bishop of Archdiocese of New York (NY, USA) (1972.07.25 – 1997.05.10) and on emeritate
 Eduardo Horacio García (2003.06.21 – 2014.11.06) as Auxiliary Bishop of Archdiocese of Buenos Aires (Argentina) (2003.06.21 – 2014.11.06); next 
Bishop of San Justo (Argentina) (2014.11.06 – ...)
 Luis Javier Argüello Garcia (2016.04.14 – ...), Auxiliary Bishop of Archdiocese of Valladolid (Spain).

Main sights 
Castillo de Aguilar, a castle known from at least the 9th century. It is mostly in ruin, a part turned into a cistern for the local aqueduct.
Casas seňoriales ("Noble  mansions"), including those of the Montalego, Arrabal and Carrera (16th-17th centuries).
Torre del Reloj  (Clock Tower), in Baroque style, built in 1770-74
Plaza de San José, a polygonal square from 1806 with the Ayuntamiento  (Town Hall).
Parish Church of Nuestra Señora del Soterraño, founded in 1260 and remade in 1530
Church of Cristo de la Salud (17th century)
Church of the Candelaria (16th century)
Church of Nuestra Sra. del Carmen (16th century)
Ermita de la Vera Cruz  (16th century)
Hospital of Santa Brigida (16th century)
Convent of San José y San Roque (1671). Also known as "Las Descalzas"

Economy
The olives and white wine of Aguilar are celebrated in Spain, although the wine, which somewhat resembles sherry, is known as Montilla, from the adjacent town of that name. Salt springs exist in the neighborhood, and to the south there are two small lakes, Zoñar and Rincon, which abound in fish.

Up to 60% of the population is engaged in agricultural work at some time during the year, although agriculture accounts for only 30% of the economic  activity.

Twin towns
 Verneuil-sur-Seine, France

See also 
 List of Catholic dioceses in Spain, Andorra, Ceuta and Gibraltar

Notes

Sources and external links
 
 Aguilar de la Frontera homepage
 Aguilar de la Frontera main page
 GCatholic - (titular) bishopric Ipagro
 Aguilar de la Frontera Statistics from the Multiterritorial Information System of Andalucía
 Economic Study of Spain - Aguilar de la Frontera
 Aguilar De La Frontera, Un Pueblo Emblemático by Diego Igeño Luque, 2005, Aires de Córdoba

Municipalities in the Province of Córdoba (Spain)